The Australian national cricket team visited Pakistan in November and December 1959 and played a three-match Test series against the Pakistani national cricket team. Australia won the Test series 2–0. Australia were captained by Richie Benaud and Pakistan by Fazal Mahmood.

Tour match

Test series summary

First Test

Second Test

Third Test

Eisenhower's visit
Day four of the Third Test in Karachi was notably attended by U.S. president Dwight Eisenhower, who was visiting Pakistan at the time. Eisenhower, who was accompanied by Pakistan's president Ayub Khan, became the first American President to watch Test cricket. According to Arunabha Sengupta, the day proved challenging for Pakistan who managed just 104 runs for the loss of five wickets, with Hanif Mohammed putting up the lone resistance against Australian bowlers. 

The U.S. President, who was seen "cheering the rare attacking strokes" and applauding every "decent effort in the field", used the occasion for cricket diplomacy – signing a cricket bat and sporting a Pakistan blazer. When Australian captain Richie Benaud saw Eisenhower wearing the blazer, he jokingly remarked: "Mr President… you have joined the other camp." 

The Karachi Test and the First Test in Dacca were played on matting pitches. Benaud and the Australian team's manager, Sam Loxton, took the opportunity when meeting the two presidents to plead that Pakistan abandon matting pitches, as the standard of play on matting was inferior. Ayub Khan subsequently decreed that Pakistan's Tests would in future all be played on turf pitches, so the Karachi Test was the last anywhere to be played on matting.

References

External links
 Tour home at ESPNcricinfo

1959 in Australian cricket
1959 in Pakistani cricket
Australian cricket tours of Pakistan
International cricket competitions from 1945–46 to 1960
Pakistani cricket seasons from 1947–48 to 1969–70